Huacheng Dadao station, formerly Shuangta station, is a metro station of the Guangzhou Metro APM line in the Zhujiang New Town of Tianhe District. It is located at the underground of the interchange of Huacheng Avenue, East Zhujiang Road, and West Zhujiang Road. It started operation on 8 November 2010.

Station layout

Exits

References

Railway stations in China opened in 2010
Guangzhou Metro stations in Tianhe District